Tyska may refer to:

Tyska Brinken, street in Gamla stan, the old town in central Stockholm, Sweden
Tyska Brunnsplan, small, triangular public square in Gamla stan, the old town in central Stockholm, Sweden
Tyska Skolgränd, alley in Gamla stan, the old town in central Stockholm, Sweden, stretching from Svartmangatan to Baggensgatan
Tyska Stallplan, street in Gamla stan, the old town in central Stockholm, Sweden

See also

Toska (disambiguation)